Lucky is an album by Japanese singer Watanabe Misato. It was released on July 6, 1991 by Sony Music Entertainment.

Track listing 
夏が来た!
ライオン・ドリーム
卒業
クリスマスまで待てない
はだかの気持
恋する人魚
めまい
タイムトンネル天国
さよならバレンタイン
大冒険
画用紙
JUMP
Kick Off

External links 
Sony Music Entertainment - Official site for Watanabe Misato. 
Album Page - Direct link to page with song listing and music samples.

1991 albums
Misato Watanabe albums